The Inner Ring Road is an arterial road in Bangalore, India. It is a six-lane link road connecting Indiranagar and Koramangala. The northern end of the road, beyond Old Airport Road from Domlur junction is called 100 Feet Road.

Inner and intermediate ring road

The Inner ring road in Bangalore is link road connecting Indiranagar and Koramangala. A number of MNCs, such as IBM, Dell, Lenovo, Continuous Computing and Microsoft are located along this road. The northern end of the road, beyond Old Airport Road is called 100 ft Road Indiranagar.

The IRR forms an important link for the Information Technology Corridor, which extends through Whitefield - Old Airport Road - Koramangala - Hi Tech City (proposed) and finally to Electronics City.

A number of important companies in the IT industry have their offices at the "Embassy Golf Links" just off the IRR close to  HAL Airport.

A big flyover has been constructed at the Domlur Junction of the IRR and Old Airport Road. It has helped in the decongestion of traffic at the Domlur signal.

Much of the land around the IRR is fenced barren defense land, which eliminates instances of people or animals crossing the road.

References

Roads in Bangalore
Ring roads in India